The Montauk Project: Experiments in Time by Preston B. Nichols and Peter Moon is the first book in a series detailing fictional time travel experiments at the Montauk Air Force Base at the eastern tip of Long Island as part of the Montauk Project.

The 1992 book and its follow up books are written in a first person style and have been classified as science fiction. The real photographs of the base and crude drawings of the project electronics in the book contributes to the authentic feel prompting the project to assume a cult status whereby websites declare it is true or false.

Using a time travel theme, the characters alter history with visits to Jesus Christ, as well as altering the outcome of American Civil War and World War II battles.

Book details

The Philadelphia Experiment
The book's narrative is centered around the Montauk Project, which is believed to be an extension or continuation of the Philadelphia Experiment (also known as Project Rainbow), which supposedly took place in 1943.

Sometime in the 1950s, surviving researchers from the original Project Rainbow began to discuss the project with an eye to continuing the research into technical aspects of manipulating the electromagnetic bottle that had been used to make the  invisible, and the reasons and possible military applications of the psychological effects of the magnetic field.

A report was supposedly prepared and presented to the United States Congress, and was soundly rejected as far too dangerous. So a proposal was made directly to the United States Department of Defense promising a powerful new weapon that could drive an enemy insane, inducing the symptoms of schizophrenia at the touch of a button. Without Congressional approval, the project would have to be top secret and secretly funded. The Department of Defense approved. Funding supposedly came from a cache of US$10 billion in Nazi gold recovered from a train found by U.S. soldiers in a train tunnel in France. The train was blown up and all the soldiers involved were killed. When those funds ran out, additional funding was secured from ITT and Krupp AG in Germany.

The experiment comes to Long Island
Work was begun at Brookhaven National Laboratory on Long Island, New York under the name Phoenix Project, but it was soon realized that the project required a large radar dish, and installing one at Brookhaven would compromise the security of the project. Luckily, the U.S. Air Force had a decommissioned base at Montauk, New York, not far from Brookhaven, which had a complete Semi Automatic Ground Environment (SAGE) radar installation. The site was large and remote (Montauk was not yet a tourist attraction) and water access would allow equipment to be moved in and out undetected.

Equipment was moved to Camp Hero at the Montauk base in the late 1960s, and installed in an underground bunker beneath the base. According to conspiracy theorists, to mask the nature of the project the site was closed in 1969 and donated as a wildlife refuge/park, with the provision that everything underground would remain the property of the Air Force (although, in reality, the base remained in operation until the 1980s).

Key parts of the original book
Experiments began in earnest in the early 1970s and during this time one, some or all of the following are claimed to have occurred at the site:

 The facility was expanded to as many as twelve levels and several hundred workers, without anyone in the town noticing the tons of building materials or hundreds of workers required. Some reports have the facility extending under the town of Montauk itself.
 Homeless people were abducted and subjected to huge amounts of electromagnetic radiation. Few survived.
 People had their psychic abilities enhanced to the point where they could materialize objects out of thin air. Stewart Swerdlow claims to have been involved in the Montauk Project, and as a result, he says, his "psionic" faculties were boosted, but at the cost of emotional instability, post-traumatic stress disorder, and other issues.
 Experiments were conducted in teleportation.
 A "porthole in time" was created which allowed researchers to travel anywhere in time or space. This was developed into a stable "Time Tunnel".
 Contact was made with alien extraterrestrials through the Time Tunnel and technology was exchanged with them which enhanced the project. This allowed broader access to "hyperspace".
 An alien monster traveled through the time tunnel, destroyed equipment, and devoured researchers. The tunnel was shut down and the creature destroyed.
 Mind control experiments were conducted and runaway boys were abducted and brought out to the base where they underwent excruciating periods of both physical and mental torture in order to break their minds, then their minds were re-programmed. Many were supposedly killed during the process and buried on the site.
 On or about August 12, 1983, the time travel project at Camp Hero interlocked in hyperspace with the original Rainbow Project back in 1943. The USS Eldridge was drawn into hyperspace and trapped there. Two men, Al Bielek and Duncan Cameron, both claim to have leaped from the deck of the Eldridge while it was in hyperspace and ended up after a period of severe disorientation at Camp Hero in the year 1983. Here they claim to have met John von Neumann, a famous physicist and mathematician, even though he was known to have died in 1957. Von Neumann had supposedly worked on the original Philadelphia Experiment, but the U.S. Navy denies this.
 Metahumans and experiments in special serums to create such individuals were tested there.
 After the experiments were completed or the destruction of the facility, depending on which book you read, the facility was closed for good, all the staff were brainwashed, shot, or sworn to absolute secrecy, and all records destroyed. According to some stories, research continues at the site to this day with enhanced security.

Experiments discussed in the other books of the series
 Filmmakers were brought to the facility to begin work on a project that would culminate with the Moon landing hoax.
 The military personnel in charge were in fact cultists who built a  ziggurat or step pyramid out of titanium for some esoteric reason.
 Early work on inventing the Internet and its implementation were undertaken there.
 Nazi scientists from Operation Paperclip were involved in some of the experiments there.
 Experimental "flying saucer" aircraft prototypes were created there, and shipped to other secret bases for testing.
 Bioengineering projects undertaken there eventually created the Jersey Devil.
 Black helicopters were manufactured and flown there.
 Nikola Tesla, whose death was faked in a conspiracy, was the chief director of operations at the base.
 Mass psychological experiments, such as the use of enormous subliminal messages projects and the creation of a "Men in Black" corps to confuse and frighten the public, were invented there.
 The AIDS virus was created there.

The Montauk Gang 
The authors have never officially declared their books to be fiction and have encouraged speculation that it is true on their publisher's website. They publish a newsletter The Pulse which continues to extend the myth and promises new books. Believers in the project regularly visit Camp Hero.

A March 2006 article in the East Hampton Star noted that a rock with ornate carvings found just below the base had been pushed over a cliff by a neighbor rather than time traveling.

The site
 

The early computers of this era were massive in size and housed in the bunker. Both the radar and the computers quickly became obsolete. Although the radars were dismantled elsewhere, the Montauk radar was subject to an intense petition drive by boaters on the crowded Long Island Sound who thought it was a more obvious landmark than the nearby Montauk Lighthouse.

The site was also full of massive gun emplacements from World War I and World War II, built in blast-resistant concrete bunkers.  There is also a modern ghost town of support buildings.  All of this was intentionally disguised to hide it from the air.

The site was opened to the public on September 18, 2002 as Camp Hero State Park. The radar tower has been placed on the State and National Register of Historic Places. There are plans for a museum and interpretive center focusing on World War II and Cold War era history.

Other books in the Montauk Project series
The following books have been published by Sky Books which lists its home at Westbury in Nassau County, New York on Long Island.
 Montauk Revisited: Adventures in Synchronicity by Preston B. Nichols and Peter Moon  published in 1993
 Pyramids of Montauk: Explorations in Consciousness by Preston B. Nichols and Peter Moon  published in 1995
 The Black Sun: Montauk's Nazi-Tibetan Connection by Preston B. Nichols and Peter Moon published in 1997
 Montauk: The Alien Connection by Stewart Swerdlow with Peter Moon (editor) published in 1998

See also
List of alleged conspiracy theories

References

External links
Sky Books website – publisher

Series of books
East Hampton (town), New York
Novels about time travel